Katzgraben is an East German film. It was released in 1957.

External links
 

1957 films
East German films
Films based on works by Bertolt Brecht
1950s German-language films
1950s German films